The Girl Who Smiled Beads: A Story About War and What Comes After is the memoir of Clemantine Wamariya, written alongside Elizabeth Weil, published April 24, 2018 by Doubleday Canada. The memoir follows Wamariya's experience as a childhood refugee in Rwanda. The book was a New York Times best seller, was critically acclaimed, and received various accolades.

Plot 
The Girl Who Smiled Beads begins in Rwanda during the Rwandan Civil War, when Wamariya was six years old. Alongside her sister Claire, Wamariya fled Rwanda, spending the next six years traveling through seven African countries as refugees. In 2000, the Wamariya sisters were granted asylum in the United States, and they landed in Chicago, unsettled. Although Wamariya spoke five languages, she did not speak English, and at twelve years old, she had never attended school formally. The Girl Who Smiled Beads showcases how, even after being granted asylum, refugees often do not feel settled and struggled to find their way in a new country.

Reception 
The Girl Who Smiled Beads was a New York Times best seller. 

The book received starred reviews from Publishers Weekly, calling it "a powerful coming-of-age story." It also received positive reviews from The Washington Post, Star Tribune, Booklist, Kirkus Reviews, Library Journal, and The Atlantic. The New York Times Book Review provided a mixed review. The New York Times included it in one of their "recommended books" lists.

Beyond popular media outlets, The Girl Who Smiled Beads has been discussed in academic contexts, including The Lancet, Roots International Journal of Multidisciplinary Researches, and Journal of the Campus Read.

References

External links

Library holdings of The Girl Who Smiled Beads

Doubleday Canada books
Refugee memoirs
2018 non-fiction books
Books about Rwanda